"Tingle" is a 1991 single by That Petrol Emotion.

Track listing

7" single

CD single

Personnel 
 Produced by Scott Litt
 "Tingle (Hard Bop Edit)" remixed by Steve Mack
 "Tingle (Hard Boppin' Mix)" remix & additional production by Steve Mack with assistance from Raymond Gorman
 "Light & Shade" produced by Steve Mack & That Petrol Emotion
 "Hey Bulldog (Live)" produced & mixed by Steve Mack

References

1990 songs
That Petrol Emotion songs
Virgin Records singles
Song recordings produced by Scott Litt